Sophia Rosenfeld (born 29 November 1966) is an American historian. She specializes in European intellectual and cultural history with an emphasis on the Enlightenment, the trans-Atlantic Age of Revolutions, and the legacy of the eighteenth century for modern democracy. In 2017, she was named the Walter H. Annenberg Professor of History at the University of Pennsylvania.

Life and career 
Rosenfeld received her B.A. from Princeton University, and Ph.D. from Harvard University in 1996. Before coming to the University of Pennsylvania Rosenfeld taught at the University of Virginia and Yale University. In 2014–15, Rosenfeld was a Member at the Institute for Advanced Study, where she researched how the maximization of choice gradually developed across the Atlantic world into a proxy for freedom in human rights struggles and consumer culture.

Her book Democracy and Truth was praised in the New Yorker's "Briefly Noted" book reviews: “Rosenfeld’s conclusion is sobering: even if the relationship between democracy and truth has long been vexed, the crisis facing Western democracies today is distinctly new.” In 2017, she was appointed the Walter H. Annenberg Professor of History.

Works 
 Democracy and Truth: A Short History (University of Pennsylvania Press, 2019)
 The Choices We Make: The Roots of Modern Freedom (forthcoming; under contract with Princeton University Press)
 Common Sense: A Political History (Harvard University Press, 2011; paperback 2014) .
 A Revolution in Language: The Problem of Signs in Late Eighteenth-Century France (Stanford University Press, 2001; paperback 2004) .   
 A Cultural History of Ideas (6 volume series covering antiquity to present, to be published by Bloomsbury Academic), General Editor (with Peter Struck, Classics, University of Pennsylvania), in progress.

References 

1966 births
Living people
American women historians
20th-century American historians
20th-century American women writers
21st-century American historians
21st-century American women writers
Dwight-Englewood School alumni
Princeton University alumni
Harvard University alumni
University of Pennsylvania faculty
University of Pennsylvania historian
Walter H. Annenberg Professor
University of Virginia faculty
Yale University faculty
Historians from New Jersey